Canyon Dam (National ID # CA00327m also known as Lake Almanor Dam) is an embankment dam on the North Fork Feather River in northern California,  southwest of Westwood.

First constructed in 1910 by the Great Western Power Company as part of the Upper North Fork Feather River Project, the dam was originally planned to be built of masonry but was later changed to an earthfill design. The dam's primary purpose was to store water for the Western Canal Company, an irrigation district in the Central Valley and a subsidiary of Great Western. Canyon Dam was modified in 1927 and 1962 to increase its usable storage. Today the dam and reservoir, owned by Pacific Gas and Electric, supply water to the 41 megawatt Butt Valley Powerhouse and provide summer flow for six hydroelectric plants on the North Fork Feather River downstream.

See also

List of dams and reservoirs in California
List of power stations in California

References

Buildings and structures in Plumas County, California
Dams completed in 1910
Energy infrastructure completed in 1910
Dams in California
Earth-filled dams
Hydroelectric power plants in California
Pacific Gas and Electric Company dams
Dams in the Feather River basin